Xianglong Subdistrict (Chinese: 湘龙街道) is a subdistrict in Changsha County, Changsha, Hunan province, China. It was established in September 2009. It is made up of five communities and three administrative villages.

Divisions of Changsha County
Changsha County